is a Japanese actor, comedian and narrator. In August 1994, he teamed up with Yoshiyuki Ishizuka to form the comedy duo "Ari to kirigirisu" or "Ant to the Grasshopper" . He has had roles in such works as The Incite Mill (2010), Suite Dreams (2006), Journey to the West (2006).

Filmography

Film

Television

References

External links
 
 
 
 Masanori Ishii (official blog)
 Masanori Ishii (personal blog)

1973 births
Living people
Japanese comedians
21st-century Japanese male actors
Japanese male television actors
People from Yokohama